1333 H Street is a high-rise building in Northwest Washington, D.C. The building rises 12 floors and  in height.

History
1333 H Street contains two connected buildings; the older west tower and the more recent east tower that was built in 1912 and 1982, respectively. Therefore, they have different architectural styles; the west tower exemplifies Beaux-Arts architecture, while the east tower is an example of modern architecture. Additionally, the building's entire facade incorporates glass, granite, and limestone as its material.

The building's ownership has changed several times. The first owner of the building was George Washington University. In 2008, it was bought by Miller Global Properties LLC, co-chaired by Myron Miller and Eyal Ofer of Global Holdings, who paid $130.7 million or about $486 per square foot to acquire it. It later sold the office to the MRP Realty and Rockpoint Group in 2014. After less than a half year ownership, the company sold the building for $162.5 million to the TA Realty, a company under Rockefeller Group in late 2015. Following the acquisition, the building was renovated in 2017. The renovation project included the new lobby, facade, and transition change between the towers. It was overseen by the previous owner, MRP Realty and managed by Davis Construction.

Ranking
As of July 2008, the structure stands as the 24th-tallest building in the city, tied in rank with 1620 L Street, 1010 Mass, 1000 Connecticut Avenue, the Republic Building, 1111 19th Street, the Army and Navy Club Building and the Watergate Hotel and Office Building.

Tenants
Tenants include the Center for American Progress, Pivotal Ventures, the Institute for International Finance, Reuters, and Democracy Forward, among others.

See also
List of tallest buildings in Washington, D.C.

References

Skyscraper office buildings in Washington, D.C.

Office buildings completed in 1982
1982 establishments in Washington, D.C.